Ankeny Regional Airport  is a mile (2 km) southeast of Ankeny, in Polk County, Iowa. It is owned by the Polk County Aviation Authority.

Facilities

The airport opened in February 1994. In the year ending September 11, 2007 the airport had 48,600 general aviation aircraft operations, average 133 per day. In January 2017, 105 aircraft were based at this airport: 91 single-engine, 8 multi-engine, 5 jet and 1 military.

Accidents and incidents

On February 5, 2008 a Swearingen SA-226AT Merlin IV operated by McNeely Charter Service was involved in an incident. A snowplow driver told the pilot he was clear to takeoff after he had plowed a part of the runway. As the plane began its takeoff roll, its left landing gear encountered deeper snow causing the plane to swerve to the left. The airplane was severely damaged when its nose landing gear hit a snowbank. The probable cause of the accident: the pilot failed to maintain directional control.

References

External links 
 Ankeny Regional (IKV) at Iowa DOT Office of Aviation
 Exec 1 Aviation, the fixed-base operator (FBO)
 Aerial photo as of 25 March 2000 from USGS The National Map
 

Airports in Iowa
Transportation buildings and structures in Polk County, Iowa
Ankeny, Iowa